Joseph Rene Fernand Gauthier (August 31, 1919 – November 7, 1992) was a Canadian professional ice hockey forward who played 229 games in the National Hockey League for the Montreal Canadiens, New York Rangers, and Detroit Red Wings between 1943 and 1949.

Career statistics

Regular season and playoffs

External links
 

1919 births
1992 deaths
Buffalo Bisons (AHL) players
Canadian ice hockey forwards
Detroit Red Wings players
Ice hockey people from Quebec
Indianapolis Capitals players
Montreal Canadiens players
Montreal Royals (QSHL) players
New York Rangers players
Quebec Aces (QSHL) players
St. Louis Flyers players
Sherbrooke Saints players
Sportspeople from Saguenay, Quebec
Washington Lions players